The following is a list of guest stars who have appeared on the television series Sesame Street.

#
 14 Karat Soul

A

 Paula Abdul Zoe's Dance Moves
 Kareem Abdul-Jabbar defines the word "subtraction" with Big Bird
 Amy Adams defines "ingredient" with Elmo
 Casey Affleck demonstrates the word "careful" with Murray
 Jessica Alba defines the word "scrumptious"
 Marv Albert episode 2756
 Buzz Aldrin NASA footage of Apollo 11 mission, episode 3697; explains to Cookie Monster that the moon is not a giant cookie, episode 4090
 Jason Alexander
 Dennis Allen
 Maria Conchita Alonso
 Alvin Ailey American Dance Theater
 Maya Angelou
 Kofi Annan helps Elmo and his friends sing the alphabet
 Aziz Ansari defines the word "ridiculous" with Grover
 Carmelo Anthony defines the word "compare" with Grover
 Christina Applegate defines the word "booth" with Elmo
 Alan Arkin
 Will Arnett appeared as Max the Magician in episode 4166
 Patricia Arquette defines the word "metamorphosis" with Abby Cadabby
 Arrested Development
 Arthur Ashe
 Hank Azaria defines the word "imposters" with Elmo

B

 Backstreet Boys sang "One Small Voice" with Elmo
 Lauren Bacall
 Erykah Badu
 Beetle Bailey appeared in a season 6 segment demonstrating "under"
 Alec Baldwin
 Carl Banks (one special): Banks, a New York Giants player, appeared during the celebrity performance of "Put Down the Duckie" in Put Down the Duckie: The Sesame Street Special
 Elizabeth Banks
 Tyra Banks acted out the word "struggle" and sang the alphabet song with Abby Cadabby (Note: This video was posted on YouTube, following the season finale)
 Tiki Barber defined "quest" and helped sing "Set Your Piggies Free"
 Sara Bareilles
 Ray Barretto
 Todd Barry
 Jason Bateman discusses the word "comfort" with Elmo
 Batman
 David Beckham acted out the word "persistent" with Elmo
 Samantha Bee
 Harry Belafonte
 Joshua Bell
 Kristen Bell defines the word "splatter" with Elmo and Abby Cadabby
 Regina Belle
 Richard Belzer both appeared on the show and they have a puppet that strongly resembles him
 Miri Ben-Ari
 Annette Bening
 Tony Bennett sings alphabet song
 George Benson
 Candice Bergen lip-synced "C is for cookie"
 Corbin Bernsen
 Halle Berry presenting the word "nibble" with Elmo
 Beyoncé (lead singer of Destiny's Child) sings "A New Way to Walk"
 Jason Biggs
 Billie Eilish singing “Happier Than Ever”
 Aloe Blacc
 Jack Black discusses "octagon" and "disguise" with Elmo
 Tempestt Bledsoe
 Dan Blocker
 Emily Blunt as Arizona Emily defines the word "explore" with Idaho Elmo
 James Blunt (singing about triangles in episode 4144)
 Andrea Bocelli sang a lullaby to Elmo based on the song "Time to Say Goodbye"
 Lisa Bonet
 Victor Borge (appeared in season 9)
 Julie Bowen discusses "binoculars" with Elmo
 Wayne Brady sings about "between"
 Zach Braff discusses "anxious" with Telly
 Benjamin Bratt demonstrates "translate" with Elmo
 Drew Brees discusses the word "measure" with Elmo
 Amy Brenneman
 Leon Bridges
 Brooklyn Tabernacle Choir
 Garth Brooks
 Alton Brown explains "recipe" with Abby Cadabby
 Blair Brown
 Chris Brown explains the word "disappear"; and sings "See the Signs" with Elmo (Note: Brown's song was pulled from broadcast due to his 2009 arrest)
 Downtown Julie Brown
 Kobe Bryant explaining the word "miniature" with Abby Cadabby
 Michael Bublé
 Buck 65 (one segment): The Canadian hip-hop artist performed a song called the "Grocery Store Rap" on the show
 Jimmy Buffett
 Steve Burns posted on Instagram with Oscar and Grover.
 Carol Burnett
 Ty Burrell discusses "hexagon" with Abby Cadabby; and shows Elmo "hide and seek"
 Barbara Bush
 Laura Bush (one segment): In episode 4032, the First Lady reads an original book called Wubba Wubba Wubba to Elmo, Big Bird, and some children. Bush has also appeared on international adaptation of the series Alam Simsim in Egypt and Galli Galli Sim Sim in India.
 Reggie Bush discussed the word "appetite" in Music Magic
 Kerry Butler
 Eugene Byrd

C

 C-3PO explains to R2-D2 that the thing he is in love with is a fire hydrant in episode 1396. "It is better to have loved a fire hydrant than never to have loved at all." (This was their second appearance; the first was in episode 1364)
 Sid Caesar
 Colbie Caillat
 Cab Calloway (appeared in several segments in season 12)
 John Candy (appeared as his Yosh Shmenge character from SCTV, but the segment was pulled after its initial airing due to complaints from Polish groups. He also made an appearance as Shmenge in "Sesame Street, Special".)
 Mary Chapin Carpenter
 Steve Carell demonstrates the word "vote" with Elmo and Abby Cadabby
 José Carreras
 Jim Carrey
 Carrie Underwood was spoofed as Carrie Underworm
 Aaron and Nick Carter teach Elmo about siblings
 Vince Carter
 Nancy Cartwright (as Bart Simpson)
 Casey Kasem voiced various letter cartoon characters
 Johnny Cash sang "Nasty Dan" with Oscar
 Dan Castellaneta (as Homer Simpson)
 Phoebe Cates
 Kim Cattrall defines the word "fabulous" for Abby Cadabby in episode 4162
 Henry Cavill defines the word "respect" with Elmo
 Cedric the Entertainer demonstrates the word "canteen" with Abby Cadabby
 Carol Channing
 Stockard Channing
 Chance the Rapper
 Tracy Chapman
 Ray Charles sings alphabet song
 Don Cheadle demonstrates "inflate" with Elmo
 Kristin Chenoweth
 Kelly Clarkson
 John Cho defines "sturdy" with Abby Cadabby
 Margaret Cho
 Hillary Clinton
 Rosemary Clooney
 Chuck Close (appeared in season 32 to demonstrate pointillism)
 Glenn Close
 Bill Cobbs
 Imogene Coca
 Andy Cohen describes the word "popular" with Elmo
 Stephen Colbert as the letter Z in Sesame Street's All Star Alphabet
 Laveranues Coles (one segment): Coles, a New York Jets player, appeared in season 38 (2007), along with other Jets, Elmo, and Elmo's goldfish Dorothy
 Judy Collins
 Shawn Colvin sings "I Don't Want to Live on the Moon" with Ernie
 Perry Como
 Common
 Harry Connick Jr.
 Tim Conway (appeared in season 2 in short segments)
 Anderson Cooper appeared on GNN to discuss the letter G
 Angel Corella
 Bill Cosby (also hosted the 20th anniversary special)
 Elvis Costello
 Katie Couric
 Cindy Crawford
 Terry Crews demonstrates the word "artist" with Abby Cadabby and Count von Count
 Sheryl Crow
 Celia Cruz
 Billy Crystal
 Alan Cumming
 Ann Curry defines the word "apology" in episode 4151
 Jane Curtin (played Cinderella in a season 16 episode, also appeared in "Sesame Street, Special")
 Jamie Lee Curtis
 Joan Cusack

D

 Tyne Daly
 Dance Theatre of Harlem
 Claire Danes demonstrates the word "diagram" with Cookie Monster
 Anthony Daniels
 Tony Danza
 Ron Darling
 Daughtry
 Geena Davis
 Michael Davis juggled foods, a bowling ball, and trash across the street in episode 1959, as well as juggling Oscar's pets; he was thought to be imaginary by Big Bird.
 Terrell Davis
 Tyrone Davis
 Viola Davis defines the word "fiesta" with Elmo
 Dominique Dawes
 Richard Dawson appeared as host of "Family Food", a takeoff on his Family Feud game show
 Robert De Niro explains what an 'actor' is to Elmo; he turns into a dog, a cabbage, and Elmo
 The Deadly Nightshade
 Ruby Dee
 Ellen DeGeneres sings alphabet song and talks about the word "ballet"
 Kat Dennings defines the word "repair" with Abby Cadabby
 Jason Derulo
 Danny DeVito
 Charlotte Diamond sings 'La Bastrangue', 'I am a Pizza' and 'Slippery Fish' on "Canadian Sesame Street"
 Cameron Diaz defines the word "tree" with Grover, explains "habitat" with the help of the Muppet animals, and sings along in "Set Your Piggies Free"
 Bo Diddley
 Daveed Diggs
 Taye Diggs (with Idina Menzel) explain the word "allergic"
 David Dinkins
 Peter Dinklage
 Kara DioGuardi defines "pasta" with Elmo
 Celine Dion
 The Dixie Chicks sing about the letter B
 Plácido Domingo (also parodied on the show as "Placido Flamingo")
 Phil Donahue
 Doug E. Doug (played Baby Bear's barber in a season 30 episode)
 Brian Doyle-Murray
 Rachel Dratch
 Fran Drescher (appeared with Baby Natasha in a season 30 sketch)
 Gustavo Dudamel demonstrates "stupendous" with Elmo

E

 Roger Ebert (appeared along with longtime screen partner Gene Siskel in season 22)
 Zac Efron defines the word "patience" with Elmo
 Billie Eilish
 En Vogue
 Julius Erving
 Giancarlo Esposito portrayed Mickey, Big Bird's camp counselor in episodes 1706–1710
 Gloria Estefan
 Melissa Etheridge

F

 Donald Faison
 Edie Falco
 Jimmy Fallon
 Anna Faris talks about "gems" with Elmo and Prince
 Colin Farrell talks about the word "investigate" with Elmo and Murray
 Suzanne Farrell
 Lorna and Lorena Feijóo dance with Zoe in episode 4162
 Leslie Feist sang an adaptation of her hit song "1234"
 José Feliciano
 Fergie
 Craig Ferguson demonstrates the word "experiment" with the help of Elmo and some chickens
 Jesse Tyler Ferguson discusses "fragile" with Cookie Monster
 José Ferrer (played Maria's uncle in season 19)
 Tina Fey as a "book-aneer" in episode 4135
 Sally Field
 Harvey Fierstein
 Fifth Harmony sings That's Music with Elmo
 Rocco Fiorentino
 Laurence Fishburne demonstrates on how to brush their teeth with Telly and Rosita
 Peggy Fleming
 Renée Fleming
 Jodie Foster
 The Four Tops
 Matthew Fox teaching Elmo about bones
 Jamie Foxx sang the alphabet with Elmo, a fox named "Jamie Fox", and a duck named "Jaime Fox"
 Dennis Franz
 Brendan Fraser teaching the word "speedy" with Grover demonstrating it, sings along in "Set Your Piggies Free"
 Walt Frazier
 Matt Frewer (appeared in character as Max Headroom)
 Santino Fontana
 Judah Friedlander teaching the word "spectacular" with Telly
 The Fugees
 Sia Furler

G

 Josh Gad demonstrating "texture" with Abby
 Johnny Galecki defines "transform" with Abby
 Zach Galifianakis defines the word "nimble" with Murray
 James Gandolfini addressing being scared of the dark, haircuts, and giant talking vegetables
 Billy Gardell defines "cheer" with Elmo and Abby Cadabby
 Jennifer Garner explaining the word "galoshes" with Abby Cadabby; demonstrates "stretch" with Elmo
 Jennie Garth defines the word "garden" with Abby Cadabby
 Pau Gasol defines the word "coach" with Abby Cadabby
 Crystal Gayle
 Sarah Michelle Gellar explaining the word "disappointed"
 Ricky Gervais defined "stumble"; helped sing "Set Your Piggies Free"; sang a Celebrity Lullaby to Elmo
 Charles Gibson defines the word "predicament" in episode 4149
 Mel Gibson
 Kathie Lee Gifford
 Dizzy Gillespie
 Evelyn Glennie
 Danny Glover
 Donald Glover as LMNOP
 Whoopi Goldberg talked with Elmo about skin color and hair texture
 Jeff Goldblum (appeared in Episode 2687 as Bob's brother, Minneapolis Johnson, who went on a quest for a golden cabbage in Snuffy's cave with Big Bird, Snuffleupagus, and Bob)
 The Goo Goo Dolls performed the song "Pride", which is based on their hit single "Slide"
 Cuba Gooding Jr. defines the word "angry" in episode 4159
 John Goodman
 Ginnifer Goodwin defines the word "adventure" with Abby Cadabby
 Jeff Gordon as a race car announcer for the Squirmadega car race
 Joseph Gordon-Levitt defines the word "reinforce" with Murray
 Nolan Gould
 Ellie Goulding
 Ben Graham (one segment): Graham, a New York Jets player, appeared in season 38 (2007), along with other Jets, Elmo, and Elmo's goldfish Dorothy
 Lauren Graham discusses "author" with Grover
 Kelsey Grammer
 Judy Graubart
 Denyce Graves
 Seth Green
 Lorne Greene (appeared with the rest of the Bonanza cast in season 2)
 Adrian Grenier acted out the word "season" with Elmo
 David Alan Grier
 Blake Griffin discusses "champion" with Abby Cadabby
 Rachel Griffiths demonstrates "dozen" in episode 4237
 Charles Grodin
 Dave Grohl performs the song “here we go” with Big Bird and Elmo
 Grumpy Cat appearing with Oscar in a video by Mashable
 Tim Gunn
 Jake Gyllenhaal appeared with an octopus stuck on his head and teaches the word "separate"
 Maggie Gyllenhaal teaches the word "surprise"; did a handstand for "Set Your Piggies Free"

H

 Bill Hader discusses the word "grouchy" with Elmo and Murray
 Margaret Hamilton (appeared in an infamous episode as The Wicked Witch of the West)
 Jon Hamm defines the word "sculpture" with Elmo
 Herbie Hancock showing off the Fairlight Synthesizer
 Kadeem Hardison
 Teri Hatcher
 Mariska Hargitay explaining the word "mystery"
 The Harlem Globetrotters (demonstrated some basketball tricks in season 2)
 Neil Patrick Harris appeared as the "Fairy Shoe Person" and defined the word "curly" with Elmo
 Niall Horan
 Samantha Harris defines "reporter" with Elmo
 Elisabeth Hasselbeck defines the word "camouflage" in episode 4199
 Anne Hathaway
 Tony Hawk counts the number of wheels on a skateboard
 Lena Headey defines the word "relax" with Murray
 Ed Helms demonstrates "grimace" with Elmo
 Christina Hendricks demonstrates "technology" with Elmo
 Don Henley
 Georgie Henley
 Taraji P. Henson
 Keith Hernandez appeared in Put Down the Duckie
 Tom Hiddleston
 Faith Hill sang about sharing with her husband, Tim McGraw
 Jonah Hill appeared wearing a fake mustache, which he gave to Elmo; defines the word "empty" with Murray
 Gregory Hines and his brother Maurice
 Hootie & the Blowfish sang about crossing the street
 Lena Horne (sang "How Do You Do?" with Grover)
 Marilyn Horne
 Dwight Howard defines the word "strategy" with Elmo
 Ron Howard
 Terrence Howard
 Jennifer Hudson
 Sarah Hughes discusses "persistence" with Elmo
 Bonnie Hunt
 Lillian Hurst

I

 Ice Cube tells Elmo about "astounding" things
 Ice-T
 Il Divo
 india.arie sings the ABC's with Elmo
 Mark Ingram (one special): Ingram, a New York Giants player, appeared during the celebrity performance of "Put Down the Duckie" in Put Down the Duckie: The Sesame Street Special
 Jeremy Irons appeared during the celebrity performance of "Put Down the Duckie" in Put Down the Duckie: The Sesame Street Special, 1988
 Bill Irwin (appeared in a season 23 sketch as a man caught in a windstorm, appeared in season 25's remake of "A New Way To Walk", appeared as "Professor Television" in season 28, and currently plays Mr. Noodle)
 Isiah Thomas
 Judith Ivey

J

 Hugh Jackman appeared with Elmo and teaches the word "concentration"
 Bo Jackson
 Gordon Jackson
 Jesse Jackson (one segment): Civil rights activist Jackson recited the free verse poem "I Am – Somebody" to numerous children and adult gathered around him on 123 Sesame Street
 Mahalia Jackson
 Randy Jackson demonstrates the word "glockenspiel" with a dog
 Samuel L. Jackson
 Kevin James
 Allison Janney
 Wyclef Jean
 Ken Jennings (one segment): Appeared in 2005 for a Healthy Moments segment, Jennings won a date with a pineapple after playing a game with Grover
 Peter Jennings
 Waylon Jennings (appeared in Follow that Bird as a truck driver)
 Ken Jeong discusses "deciduous" with Elmo
 Carly Rae Jepsen
 Michael Jeter (appeared in a rendition of the alphabet song, sang a version of "Dance Myself to Sleep", and played Mr. Noodle's brother, Mr. Noodle)
 The New York Jets represented by Chad Pennington, Laveranues Coles, Ben Graham, and head coach Eric Mangini (episode 4147)
 Billy Joel sings with Marlee Matlin
 Elton John
 Arte Johnson (appeared as his Laugh-In character, Wolfgang, in season 2)
 Nick Jonas (sang "Check That Shape")
 James Earl Jones (guest starred in the first season (1969), reciting the alphabet and counting numbers. He later hosted the 10th anniversary special, where he was reunited with his former drama teacher, Will Lee.)
 Jason Jones
 Norah Jones sings with Elmo about her friend Y not meeting her; sings "Don't Know Why"
 Sarah Jones
 Shirley Jones
 Juanes

K

 Madeline Kahn
 Mindy Kaling discusses "enthusiastic" with Elmo
 Carol Kane
 Kate Pierson in Furry Happy Monsters as a muppet
 Julie Kavner (as Marge Simpson)
 Matt Kemp demonstrates the word "attach" with Abby Cadabby
 Anna Kendrick defines "absorb" with Elmo and Abby Cadabby
 Alicia Keys
 Chaka Khan
 Kid 'n Play
 Nicole Kidman defines "stubborn" with Oscar the Grouch
 Taran Killam
 Jimmy Kimmel defines "sibling"
 Richard Kind (playing a Balloon Fairy in episode 4088)
 B.B. King
 Larry King
 Greg Kinnear demonstrating the word "machine"
 Reverend Frederick Douglass Kirkpatrick
 Kevin Kline
 Heidi Klum defines "compliment" with Elmo and a boot
 Gladys Knight & the Pips
 T. R. Knight – Letter "I" – Private I
 Daniel Koren
 Jane Krakowski
 Diana Krall
 John Krasinski defines "soggy" with Murray
 Alison Krauss
 Kronos Quartet
 Mila Kunis defines "include" with Elmo and two dancing sheep

L

 Patti LaBelle
 Nick Lachey
 Ladysmith Black Mambazo
 Emeril Lagasse
 Lamb Chop (sings alphabet song, also appeared in the season 26 finale)
 Burt Lancaster
 Sean Landeta (one special): Landeta, a New York Giants player, appeared during the celebrity performance of "Put Down the Duckie" in Put Down the Duckie: The Sesame Street Special
 Michael Landon (appeared with the rest of the Bonanza cast in season 2)
 Nathan Lane sings "Sing" with the Oinker Sisters
 Queen Latifah
 Matt Lauer explains what he can do with a newspaper in episode 4136, also interviewing Cookie Monster about his decision to eat fruit.
 Jude Law demonstrating the word "cling"
 Spike Lee
 John Legend
 John Leguizamo taught Elmo about healthy vegetables.
 Jay Leno
 Zachary Levi defines the word "applause" with Elmo
 * Shari Lewis (appeared with Lamb Chop in the season 26 finale)
 Little Richard
 Blake Lively
 LL Cool J sings the song "Addition Expedition" with Elmo; sings about the number 1; defines "unanimous" with Elmo and Abby Cadabby
 Rebecca Lobo
 Kenny Loggins
 Nia Long demonstrates "divide" with Abby Cadabby
 Eva Longoria demonstrating the word "exquisite"
 George Lopez defines the word "liquid" with Elmo and Abby Cadabby
 Mario Lopez appeared as a reporter for "Extra" in episode 4305
 Los Lobos
 Lindsay Lohan (appeared as a young child in "The Braid-y Bunch")
 Julia Louis-Dreyfus
 Kellan Lutz defines the word "vibrate" with Cookie Monster
 Loretta Lynn
 Evan Lysacek discusses "confidence" with Elmo
 Luxo Jr.
 MC Lyte

M

 Yo-Yo Ma
 Macklemore
 Robert MacNeil
 Main Street
 Zayn Malik
 Howie Mandel demonstrates "ticklish" in episode 4143
 Eric Mangini (one segment): Mangini, the New York Jets coach, appeared in season 38 (2007), along with other Jets, Elmo, and Elmo's goldfish Dorothy
 Julianna Margulies as Dr. Berger who helps heal Big Bird's broken wing
 Cheech Marin
 Ziggy Marley
 Bruno Mars sang "Don't Give Up"
 Branford Marsalis
 Wynton Marsalis
 James Marsden defines the word "engineer" with Elmo
 Andrea Martin (appeared as Edith Prickley in several segments, guest starred as Wanda Falbo, Word Fairy, and narrated the television segments on Elmo's World)
 J. R. Martinez
 Marlee Matlin sings with Billy Joel
 Dave Matthews sings "I Need a Word" with Grover on the start of the 44th season on September 16, 2013
 Jessica Mauboy
 John Mayer in a Primetime Special that appeared on April 1, 2009
 Whitman Mayo
 Debi Mazar defining "humongous" in episode 4211
 Jack McBrayer
 Martina McBride sang "That's Pretending" with Elmo
 Jenny McCarthy imitating several sorts of insect
 Melissa McCarthy discusses "choreographer" with Elmo
 Jesse McCartney
 Tim McCarver
 Audra McDonald
 Frances McDormand as a fictionalized version of herself working as a department store worker (from the television special/VHS release Big Bird Gets Lost)
 Bobby McFerrin
 Phil McGraw co-hosting with Dr. Feel
 Tim McGraw sang about sharing with his wife, Faith Hill
 Ewan McGregor
 Joel McHale defines "prickly"
 Michael McKean Rock, Rock Band (episode 4234, season 41)
 Ian McKellen defining "resist", tries to make Cookie Monster resist from eating a cookie
 Don McLean
 Wendi McLendon-Covey demonstrates "strenuous" with Elmo
 Christopher Meloni
 Maria Menounos defines "senses"
 Menudo
 Idina Menzel (with Taye Diggs) explain the word "allergic"
 Natalie Merchant
 Ethel Merman
 Debra Messing defines "nature"
 Metropolitan Opera
 Seth Meyers discusses "greeting" with Count von Count
 MF Grimm
 Lin-Manuel Miranda as Freddy Flapman in episode 4187
 Jay Mohr defines the word "tool" in episode 4308
 Janelle Monáe sings "The Power of Yet"
 Michelle Monaghan defines "fascinating" with Abby Cadabby
 Mickey Guyton
 Julianne Moore
 Natalie Morales defines the word "float" with Abby Cadabby
 Rick Moranis
 Rita Moreno
 Alanis Morissette sang "U Oughta Know", a song about words that start with the letter U
 Mark Morris
 Michael Moschen
 John Moschitta Jr. (appeared in season 16 as a man whose children's names have a name beginning with every letter, as well as a spokesman for "Peter Piper's P Products")
 Zero Mostel
 Bobby Moynihan appeared as Quacker Duck Man in episode 4325
 Jason Mraz sings "Outdoors" (to the tune of his hit "I'm Yours") with Sesame Street friends about going outside
 Megan Mullally defines the word "distract"
 Mummenschanz
 Anne Murray
 Mike Myers

N

 Jim Nabors (recited the alphabet in season 2)
 Ralph Nader appeared singing "People in Your Neighborhood" in Put Down the Duckie: The Sesame Street Special, 1988.
 Kathy Najimy
 Joe Namath
 National Theatre of the Deaf
 Martina Navratilova
 Kunal Nayyar defines "robot" with Grover and a robot
 Ne-Yo
 Liam Neeson (appeared reciting the alphabet for Ernie in season 30)
 Karl Nelson (one special): Nelson, a New York Giants player, appeared during the celebrity performance of "Put Down the Duckie" in Put Down the Duckie: The Sesame Street Special
 Aaron Neville
 New York City Ballet
 New York Philharmonic
 Fred Newman (appeared in an episode of Elmo's World to talk about things that he can do with his mouth)
 Laraine Newman
 Soichi Noguchi
 Brandy Norwood
 Bill Nye
 Lupita Nyong'o and Elmo talk about skin
 NSYNC

O

 Michelle Obama shows kids how to plant vegetables
 Conan O'Brien (one segment, two specials): O'Brien has guested on Sesame Street itself, as well as two special productions. While trying to deliver a tape in the Elmopalooza special, Big Bird runs through the set of Late Night with Conan O'Brien, where he is interviewing the Yip Yips; also seen is Andy Richter. O'Brien appeared in a celebrity montage of "Sing", for 2004 DVD What's the Name of That Song.
 Jerry O'Connell demonstrates "observe" with Murray
 Nancy O'Dell defines the word "pollinate"
 Chris O'Donnell defines the word "activate"
 Rosie O'Donnell
 Sandra Oh as a Cookie Fairy (episode 4184)
 OK Go
 Timothy Olyphant discusses "proud" with Abby Cadabby
 Jeffrey Osborne
 Donny Osmond
 Seiji Ozawa conducted The Italian Street Song as sung by Senior Placido Flamingo and the All-Animal Orchestra.

P

 Brad Paisley
 Sarah Jessica Parker demonstrates "sighing" and "pair" with Elmo; looks for "big" with Super Grover
 Jim Parsons explains the word "arachnid"
 Paula Patton defines the word "innovation" with Elmo
 Pat Paulsen (made several appearances in season 2)
 Liam Payne (sang "What Makes U Useful" with the letter U)
 Pelé in Villa Sesamo
 Fred Penner sings 'I Had a Rooster' and 'The Cat Came Back' on "Canadian Sesame Street"
 Chad Pennington (one segment): Pennington, a New York Jets player, appeared in season 38 (2007), along with other Jets, Elmo, and Elmo's goldfish Dorothy
 Ty Pennington
 Pentatonix
 Itzhak Perlman (gave Telly a violin lesson)
 Rhea Perlman (as the "old woman who lived in a shoe" that landed on Big Bird's nest after a hurricane, also appeared with husband Danny DeVito in the 25th anniversary special)
 Katy Perry appeared in a skit with Elmo parodying her song "Hot n Cold". The skit was intended to air on the actual series, but the producers overturned their decision due to parent's reaction to Perry's revealing wardrobe.
 Tyler Perry
 Joe Pesci (appeared as "Ronald Grump" in the 25th anniversary special)
 Michael Phelps
 Regis Philbin
 Lou Diamond Phillips
 David Hyde Pierce
 The Pink Panther (demonstrated the letter K in season 2)
 Amy Poehler demonstrates "challenge" with Elmo
 The Pointer Sisters
 Troy Polamalu discusses "fragrance" with Elmo
 Ellen Pompeo teaching the word "healthy" with Elmo
 John Popper
 Natalie Portman plays "Princess and the Elephant" with Elmo; fills in for Alan at Hooper's when he goes on vacation to Hawaii
 Richard Pryor (recited the alphabet)
 Tito Puente (a song of his was also used as background music in a segment about snow cones)
 Albert Pujols discusses "athlete" with Grover
 Keshia Knight Pulliam

Q

 Dennis Quaid
 Zachary Quinto defines the word "flexible" with Grover

R

 R2-D2
 R.E.M. sing the song "Furry, Happy Monsters"
 Sally Jessy Raphaël
 Ahmad Rashad defines the word "gigantic" in episode 4152
 Lou Rawls (one segment): Rawls appeared in a segment during the first season, to sing the alphabet. He dismissed the concept of using cue cards for the performance, but reversed such decision when he forgot the order of the letters.
 Rachael Ray (two segments): one baking pumpernickel bread and one describing the word 'amazing'
 Jeff Redd he sang Between.
 Helen Reddy
 Christopher Reeve (two segments): Reeve first appeared on the show in 2000 for two segments; in one Reeve says the alphabet with Ernie and Ernie's Rubber Duckie, the other he demonstrates the independent living skills he developed after acquiring a disability in 1995 (quadriplegia)
 Paul Reubens (two segments): Reubens, as Pee-wee Herman, recited his own version of the alphabet in a 1987 insert. Reubens was also recorded for the celebrity version of Put Down the Duckie.
 Malvina Reynolds season 4 cast member: A folksinger, songwriter, and political activist, then 73-year-old Reynolds appeared on the show performing songs "This House Is Your House".
 Ryan Reynolds as the letter A in "The A Team"
 Andy Richter (one special): While trying to deliver a tape in the Elmopalooza special, Big Bird runs through the set of Late Night with Conan O'Brien, where Conan is interviewing the Yip Yips; Richter is seen in the background very briefly.
 Sally Ride (one segment): In January 1984, the year immediately following her historic mission, Ride taped a segment on the series where she talks about how A is for astronaut, while Grundgetta visits
 Kelly Ripa unable to find the slip of paper on which she wrote the meaning of "frustrated" in episode 4144
 Tim Robbins (two segments and one street scene): Robbins appeared in two 1990 insert segments. In the first, he performs at Prairie Dawn's pageant about the seasons; Robbin's then 5-year-old daughter Eva appeared at the end of the segment. The second, first aired episode 3960, he talks about surprises with Elmo. In a 1997 street scene, Robbins rents a room at the Furry Arms Hotel, which he shares with Muppet animals. Talking to Sesame Street Magazine in 1997, Robbins listed three reasons for appearing on the show: his children, Eva, Jack Henry, and Miles. Robbin's then five-year-old son Miles taped three segments with Baby Bear that appeared throughout the 29th season.
 Doris Roberts (two appearances in one special): In the introduction to Sesame Street special The Street We Live On, Roberts is one of the celebrities in the "My Favorite Sesame Street Moments" clip. She later appeared in a celebrity montage of the song "Dance Myself to Sleep".
 Julia Roberts Elmo demonstrates to her how to look scared
 Robin
 Craig Robinson defines the word "pattern" with Elmo
 Jackie Robinson recites the alphabet in season 1
 Smokey Robinson sings "You Really Got a Hold on Me" for the letter "U"
 Chris Rock
 Adam Rodriguez as Detective (Alphie) Betts, helps Elmo and Abby find the missing R objects stolen by the Letter R
 Gina Rodriguez
 Rico Rodriguez defines the word "magnify" with Elmo
 Seth Rogen defines "embarrassed" with Elmo
 Fred Rogers
 Al Roker defines the word "family"
 Ray Romano
 Rebecca Romijn defines "accessories" with Abby Cadabby
 Linda Ronstadt
 Tracee Ellis Ross
 Diana Ross sings the song "If You Believe" with Big Bird in 1979
 Emmy Rossum defines the word "focus" with Abby Cadabby
 Mike Rowe appeared with Oscar the Grouch in a segment parody of Dirty Jobs called "Dirtiest Jobs"
 Paul Rudd discusses "brilliant" with Grover
 Maya Rudolph demonstrates "brainstorm" with Elmo
 Mark Ruffalo defines "empathy" with Murray
 Amy Ryan defines the word "paleontologist" with Elmo
 Meg Ryan with Elmo and Julia

S

 Buffy Sainte-Marie (a regular on the show from 1975 to 1981)
 Zoe Saldana defined "transportation" with Elmo
 Tony Saletan
 Lea Salonga
 Andy Samberg
 Adam Sandler sings "a song about Elmo" and meets up with Cookie Monster to talk about the word "crunchy"
 Romeo Santos
 Susan Sarandon sings alphabet song
 Adam Savage provided the voice of Heathcliff in his father's "He, She, and It" animated segments
 Diane Sawyer
 Liev Schreiber explains "exchange" with Elmo and his then-wife Naomi Watts and also appeared in "Elmo's Got the Moves"
 Diane Schuur
 Adam Scott defines "awful" with Murray
 Jay Sean
 Amy Sedaris
 Kyra Sedgwick
 Pete Seeger
 Amanda Seyfried Natalie Neptune
 Molly Shannon
 Ed Sheeran sings the song "Two Different Worlds"
 Jerry Seinfeld
 Dax Shepard demonstrates "amplify" with Abby Cadabby
 Sherri Shepherd defined "identical"
 David Shiner
 Martin Short (appeared in character as Ed Grimley)
 Paul Simon sings "Me and Julio Down by the Schoolyard"
 Nina Simone
 The Simpsons
 Sinbad
 Gene Siskel
 Jeff Smith
 Yeardley Smith (as Lisa Simpson)
 Cobie Smulders discusses "courteous" with Grover
 Brittany Snow defines the word "friend" with Elmo
 Sonia Sotomayor defines "career" with Abby Cadabby
 Spin Doctors (one segment): sang the song "Cooperation" (Two Princes) with Elmo, Zoe, and Telly Monster
 Squirrel Nut Zippers
 Gwen Stefani
 Isaac Stern
 Jon Stewart defines "practice" in a taped segment
 Patrick Stewart sings alphabet song
 Ben Stiller sang "These are the People in Our Neighborhood" with Telly
 Michael Stipe
 Richard Stoltzman appeared on episode 2633. During the first street scene, He plays The Sesame Street theme song on the clarinet. Later on in the episode. He explains to Oscar that playing the clarinet with just the pieces will not make a good sound. When he built the pieces together, he can play. He plays Rhapsody in Blue.
 Emma Stone acts out the word "balance" with Abby Cadabby
 Eric Stonestreet demonstrates "remember" with Abby Cadabby
 Amar'e Stoudemire defines the word "compare" with Grover
 Picabo Street
 Ruben Studdard
 Harry Styles (sang "What Makes U Useful" with the letter U)
 Sugarland
 Nicole Sullivan
 Wanda Sykes defines "journal" with Elmo

T

 Take 6
 James Taylor (sang "Jellyman Kelly" in season 14)
 Jason Taylor defining "toss" with Elmo
 Charlize Theron defines "jealous" with Abby Cadabby
 Lynne Thigpen (appeared in season 29 as the WASA Training instructor)
 Isiah Thomas
 Tilly and the Wall
 Ashley Tisdale
 The Tokyo String Quartet
 Marisa Tomei
 Lily Tomlin
 LaDainian Tomlinson defines the word "celebration" with Elmo
 Louis Tomlinson (sang "What Makes U Useful" with the letter U)
 Joe Torre
 Robert Townsend
 Train sings "Five By"
 Randy Travis (sang "You Gotta Ask Some Questions" in season 22)
 Alex Trebek
 Travis Tritt
 Kathleen Turner

U

 Tracey Ullman (appeared as herself in season 20)
 Blair Underwood
 Carrie Underwood as "Carrie Underworm" performing "The Worm Anthem"
 Usher defined "volunteer" with Elmo, he also sang "The ABCs of Moving You" with various muppets (over 115 million YouTube views), defined "unique" with Bert

V

 Luther Vandross
 Sofía Vergara demonstrates "baile" with Elmo
 Meredith Vieira defined the word "hibernate"

W

 Alice Walker
 Bill Walsh
 Barbara Walters
 Patrick Warburton explains "stuck" with a chicken stuck in his shirt
 Malcolm-Jamal Warner
 Denzel Washington
 Naomi Watts explains "exchange" with Elmo and her then-husband Liev Schreiber and also appeared in "Elmo's Got the Moves"
 Rutina Wesley demonstrates the word "plan" with Elmo and Abby Cadabby
 Forest Whitaker defines "imagination" with Count von Count
 Lillias White season 21–24 cast member, 1 street scene: White appeared from 1989 through 1993 as "Lillian", a regular cast member of the show, winning a Daytime Emmy Award for her performance. During her stint, she also voiced the lead singer of The Squirrelles, a Muppet singing group, consisting of three squirrels. She returned in 2006 as a guest for a season 37 street scene, playing Gabi and Miles' kindergarten teacher Ms. Walsh, in a flashback sequence.
 Shaun White
 will.i.am sings "What I Am"
 Brian Williams demonstrates "squid" in a separately-recorded segment, and also as a guest news-anchor reporting that nobody on Sesame Street is sharing (due to a disease called "Mine-Itis")
 Jesse Williams defines "furious" with Elmo
 Joe Williams
 Pharrell Williams
 Robin Williams (seven segments): Williams appeared numerous times in the 1990s and 2000s. In the first, aired in 1992 as episode 2963, Williams uses his shoe to demonstrate what makes something alive. Robin then appeared in a celebrity version of "Monster in the Mirror". Another segment has Robin comparing the similarities and difference between himself and a Muppet robin. In another segment, Williams asks Elmo and the kids whether they would allow a nonsense talking, horned two-headed stranger to play baseball with them. In 2000's episode 3684, Williams talks to Elmo about what you can do with a stick. In 2001's episode 3923, Williams shows off the wonders of feet. The Two Headed Monster shows up to play. In 2012's episode 4280, Williams defines the word "conflict" with The Two Headed Monster.
 Vanessa Williams
 Venus Williams
 Wendy Williams defines the word "veterinarian"
 Chandra Wilson defines the word "half" with Murray
 Flip Wilson
 Mara Wilson with Julia
 Mookie Wilson
 Oprah Winfrey on season 41 premiere, as the voice of 'O' on "The O Show"
 Henry Winkler
 Lee Ann Womack
 Stevie Wonder
 BD Wong
 Noah Wyle sings with Big Bird

Y

 Trisha Yearwood
 Yo-Yo Ma

Notes

References

External links
 Official website of "Sesame Street"
 

Lists of celebrities
Lists of guest appearances in television